The NCAA Division I Wrestling Championships have been held annually since 1928, except for a hiatus in 1943–45 during World War II and in 2020 due to the coronavirus pandemic.

Since 1934, team scoring officially became a permanent feature of the NCAA Wrestling Championships. In 1928 and from 1931–1933, there was only an unofficial team title. Oklahoma A&M (now Oklahoma State) won the 1928 and 1931 unofficial titles. Indiana won the 1932 unofficial title, and in 1933, Iowa State and Oklahoma A&M were unofficial co-champions.

The NCAA Division I Wrestling Championships is a double-elimination tournament for individuals competing in ten weight classes. Thirty-three wrestlers in each weight class qualify through eight conference championship tournaments. Each of these conference tournaments are allocated a number of automatic qualifying slots in each weight class, and the unallocated slots are filled with at-large selections picked by the NCAA Division I Wrestling Committee based on certain criteria.  During the championships, individual match winners earn points based on the level and quality of the victory, which are totaled to determine the team championship standings.

The Oklahoma State Cowboys have won more NCAA team championships than any other school, with 34 titles (including 3 unofficial), the most recent being won in 2006. Ed Gallagher coached the Cowboys to their first title in 1928 and won 11 in 13 years from 1928 through 1940. Iowa has won the second most team titles with 24 NCAA titles. Under head coach Dan Gable, Iowa had the longest streak of consecutive titles at nine from 1978 through 1986. Penn State has won 11 titles, Iowa State has won eight titles, and Oklahoma has won seven championships. Only seven other schools have won a team title, with none of those schools having won more than three championships. Since 2011, Penn State under coach head coach Cael Sanderson has won 10 NCAA team titles. Only the 2001 Minnesota Golden Gophers have finished the NCAA Tournament with an All-American at every weight class, and famously won the team championship despite not having a single finalist.  

Long held at host college campuses, since 2000 the tournament has grown exponentially in popularity and as such is now held in major cities at professional sports arenas before large, loyal crowds. Central to the expansion of "March Matness" (a play on March Madness, the nickname for the NCAA basketball tournaments) has been television network ESPN, which broadcasts all days of the tournament live and provides additional feeds dedicated to one particular mat online.

In addition to determining the national championship, the NCAA Division I Wrestling Championships also determine the Division I All-America team. The top eight finishers in each weight class earn All-American status. The top four teams earn podium and team trophy finishes.

Championships

Champions by year

Prior to 1963, only a single national championship was held for all members of the NCAA; Division II competition began in 1963, with Division III following in 1974.

Championships by school

Winning streaks

#: No championship was held from 1943-1945 due to WWII.

Individual champions
Sources

1928

1929–1931

1932

1933–1935

1936

1937–1938

1939–1947

1948

1949–1950

1951

1952–1965

1966–1969

1970–1986

1987–1998

1999–2023

Four-time NCAA champions
Sources
 Pat Smith (Oklahoma State), 1990–1992, 1994
 Cael Sanderson (Iowa State), 1999–2002
 Kyle Dake (Cornell), 2010–2013
 Logan Stieber (Ohio State), 2012−2015
 Yianni Diakomihalis (Cornell), 2018−2019, 2022–2023

See also
 Pre-NCAA Wrestling Champion
 NCAA Division II Wrestling Championships (since 1963)
 NCAA Division III Wrestling Championships (since 1974)
 NAIA national wrestling championship (since 1958)
 Canadian Interuniversity Sport
 Intercollegiate women's wrestling champions
 List of NCAA Division I wrestling programs

References

External links
 NCAA History of D1 Wrestling Championships

 
Championship
Wrestling
Recurring sporting events established in 1928